Cochylimorpha tiraculana is a species of moth of the family Tortricidae. It is found in France, Italy and Switzerland.

The wingspan is 14–18 mm. Adults have been recorded on wing from July to August.

References

Moths described in 1989
Cochylimorpha
Moths of Europe